Seljestad is part of the town of Harstad within Harstad Municipality in Troms county, Norway. It is located to the south of the city center and north of the neighborhoods of Harstadbotn and Grønnebakkan.

The primary and secondary schools Seljestad barneskole and Seljestad ungdomsskole are located here, just west of  Seljestadvegen street.

References

Harstad